Cirsium rivulare is a species of flowering plant in the family Asteraceae, native to
eastern and western Europe, adventive in Britain, and naturalised in Sweden and Belgium. 

The Latin specific epithet rivulare means "brook loving". The plant prefers moist conditions but can tolerate some dryness.

The cultivar Cirsium rivulare 'Atropurpureum', with deep crimson flowers, has received the Royal Horticultural Society's Award of Garden Merit. It is very hardy down to at least  (RHS rating H7), and thrives in full sun.

References

rivulare